Blount County is a county located in the U.S. state of Alabama. As of the 2020 census, the population was 59,134. Its county seat is Oneonta.

Blount County is a moist county. In the November 6, 2012 elections, a countywide ballot initiative to allow alcohol sales was narrowly defeated, but Blountsville, Cleveland and Oneonta have allowed for the sale of alcohol since 2013.

Blount County has been dubbed the "Covered Bridge Capital of Alabama" since it has more historic covered bridges standing within a single county than any other in the state - with earlier covered bridges known of. This county celebrates the Covered Bridge Festival every autumn in Oneonta to commemorate its three remaining covered bridges.

History
Blount County was created by the Alabama Territorial Legislature on February 6, 1818, formed from land ceded to the federal government by the Creek Nation on August 9, 1814. This county was named for Governor Willie Blount of Tennessee, who provided assistance to settlers in Alabama during the Creek War. This county lies in the northeastern quadrant of the state, which is sometimes known as the mineral region of Alabama. Blount County is bordered by Cullman, Marshall, Etowah, Jefferson, Walker, and St. Clair Counties. This county is drained by the Locust and Mulberry Forks of the Black Warrior River. The Warrior coal field is located in Blount County.

Caleb Fryley and John Jones established Bear Meat Cabin in 1816. Its post office was opened in 1821, and the settlement was incorporated as Blountsville on December 13, 1827. In 1889, an election resulted in the county seat being transferred to Oneonta, Alabama.

Geography

Adjacent counties
Marshall County – northeast
Etowah County – east
St. Clair County – southeast
Walker County – southwest
Jefferson County – south
Cullman County – northwest

Transportation

Major highways
 Interstate 65
 U.S. Highway 31
 U.S. Highway 231
 U.S. Highway 278
 State Route 67
 State Route 75
 State Route 79
 State Route 132
 State Route 160

Rail
 CSX Transportation, formerly the Louisville and Nashville Railroad

Demographics

2020 census

As of the 2020 United States census, there were 59,134 people, 20,847 households, and 14,874 families residing in the county.

2010 census
As of the census of 2010, there were 57,322 people, 16,175 households, and 16,175 families residing in the county. The population density was 88.79 people per square mile. There were 23,887 housing units at an average density of 37 per square mile. The racial makeup of the county was 92.6% White, 1.3% Black or African American, 0.5% Native American, 0.2% Asian, 0.1% Pacific Islander, 4.1% from other races, and 1.2% from two or more races. 8.1% of the population were Hispanic or Latino of any race.

There were 16,175 family households, of which 31.1% had children under the age of 18 living with them, 60.6% were married couples living together, 9.7% had a female householder with no husband present, and 25% were non-families. Alternative households included: 22.2% of households were made up of those living alone and 9.7% had someone living alone who was 65 years of age or older. The average household size was 2.63 and the average family size was 3.72.

Blount County's population spread was as follows: 25.40% under the age of 18, 8.40% from 18 to 24, 29.20% from 25 to 44, 24.10% from 45 to 64, and 12.90% were 65 years of age or older. The median age was 36 years. For every 100 females, there were 99.70 males. For every 100 females age 18 and over, there were 97.30 males.

The median income for a household in the county was $35,241, and the median income for a family was $41,573. Males had a median income of $31,455 versus $22,459 for females. The per capita income for the county was $16,325. About 8.60% of families and 11.70% of the population were below the poverty line, including 13.20% of those under age 18 and 17.40% of those age 65 or over.

Education 
Blount County contains two public school districts. There are approximately 9,200 students in public PK-12 schools in Blount County.

Districts 
School districts include:

 Blount County School District
 Oneonta City School District

Communities

Cities

 Oneonta (county seat)
 Warrior (Partly in Jefferson County)

Towns

 Allgood
 Altoona (partly in Etowah County)
 Blountsville
 Cleveland
 County Line (partly in Jefferson County)
 Garden City (partly in Cullman County)
 Hayden
 Highland Lake
 Locust Fork
 Nectar
 Rosa
 Snead
 Susan Moore
 Trafford (partly in Jefferson County)

Census-designated places
 Remlap
 Smoke Rise

Unincorporated communities

 Bangor
 Blount Springs
 Bright Star
 Brooksville
 Hopewell
 Little Warrior
 Mount High
 Sky Ball
 Summit

Government
Blount County is a stronghold for Republicans. Since 2004, it has voted for the Republican presidential nominee with at least eighty percent of the vote every time. It was Hubert Humphrey's weakest county in the nation in 1968 with only 3.64 percent of the vote.

Places of interest
Blount County is home to an abundance of outdoor activities, such as Rickwood Caverns State Park and the Locust Fork of the Black Warrior River that are used by canoeists and kayakers. The county is also home to the picturesque covered bridges mentioned below: the Swann Covered Bridge, the Horton Mill Covered Bridge, and the Easley Covered Bridge. As of summer 2009, all three bridges were closed due to safety concerns at the recommendation of the Alabama Department of Transportation. Restorations were completed from 2011 through 2013 and they are once again open.

See also
List of Alabama covered bridges
National Register of Historic Places listings in Blount County, Alabama
Properties on the Alabama Register of Landmarks and Heritage in Blount County, Alabama

References

External links
official site

 

 
Birmingham metropolitan area, Alabama
1818 establishments in Alabama Territory
Populated places established in 1818
Counties of Appalachia